Sobieraj is a Polish surname. It may refer to:

 Czesław Sobieraj (1914–1985), Polish sprint canoeist
 Krzysztof Sobieraj (born 1981), Polish football manager
 Małgorzata Sobieraj (born 1982), Polish archer
 Mateusz Sobieraj (1992-present), Polish independent trader

See also
 

Polish-language surnames